Yuri Aleksandrovich Mentyukov (born 7 February 1962) is a Russian professional football coach and a former player.

Club career
He made his professional debut in the Soviet Top League in 1980 for FC Dynamo Moscow.

Honours
 Soviet Cup winner: 1984.

European club competitions
With FC Dynamo Moscow.

 UEFA Cup 1982–83: 2 games, 1 goal.
 European Cup Winners' Cup 1984–85: 1 game.

References

1962 births
Footballers from Moscow
Living people
Soviet footballers
Russian footballers
Association football midfielders
FC Dynamo Moscow players
Soviet Top League players
FC Shinnik Yaroslavl players
Russian football managers
FC Arsenal Tula players